Magunta Sreenivasulu Reddy (born 15 October 1953) is an Indian Politician who is the current Member of Parliament in 17th Lok Sabha. He represents Ongole constituency of Andhra Pradesh and is a member of Yuvajana Sramika Rythu Congress Party. He got elected to the 12th,14th and 15th Lok Sabha as a Candidate of Indian National Congress and again to 17th Lok Sabha as a candidate of YSR Congress Party.

He quit Congress in 2014, soon after the bill to split Andhra Pradesh was passed by the Lok Sabha and joined Telugu Desam Party and became Member of Legislative Council.

He lost the 2014 Indian general election and joined YSR Congress Party in 2019, where he contested from Ongole as a candidate of YSRCP and won with a record majority of 2,14,000 votes. 

Magunta Sreenivasulu Reddy was ex-Vice president of National TDP wing.

General Elections 2019

References

Indian National Congress politicians from Andhra Pradesh
Telugu Desam Party politicians
1953 births
Living people
Telugu politicians
India MPs 1998–1999
India MPs 2004–2009
India MPs 2009–2014
Lok Sabha members from Andhra Pradesh
People from Nellore